Patrick James Foley (1836–28 June 1914) was a successful financial entrepreneur and an Irish politician and Member of Parliament for Galway Connemara from 1885 to 1895.

Son of Patrick Foley, of Sligo, he was born in Leeds and educated at Catholic schools in Prescot and Leeds. In 1864 he founded the Pearl Life Assurance Loan and Investment Company Ltd, renamed the Pearl Life Assurance Company in 1874, and was later President. He was also chairman of the Industrial Assurances Protection Association and president of the National Amalgamated Approved Society founded in 1912.

He was elected unopposed as MP for Galway Connemara in 1885 and 1886. When the Irish Parliamentary Party split in December 1890 over the leadership of Charles Stewart Parnell, Foley sided with the Anti-Parnellite Irish National Federation. At the 1892 general election he was challenged by a Parnellite, J. H. Joyce. However, he retained the seat easily, by 2,637 votes to 598.

Foley was secretary of the Irish National League of Great Britain.

He married, in 1862, a daughter of John Lawrence, of Liverpool.

There is a statue to Foley on the front of the Pearl Chambers building on the Headrow in Leeds.

Notes

Sources

External links

1836 births
1914 deaths
Members of the Parliament of the United Kingdom for County Galway constituencies (1801–1922)
Anti-Parnellite MPs
UK MPs 1885–1886
UK MPs 1886–1892
UK MPs 1892–1895
Politicians from County Galway